Sharan may refer to:

Sharan (actor) (born 1976), Indian actor
Sharan (poet), a Sanskrit poet of 12th-century Bengal
Devi Sharan, airline pilot and captain during the Indian Airlines flight 814 hijacking
Sharan, Iran (disambiguation), places in Iran
Sharan, Russia, a rural locality in Sharansky District of the Republic of Bashkortostan, Russia
Sharan, alternative name of Sharana, city and capital of Paktika Province, Afghanistan
Volkswagen Sharan, a multi-purpose vehicle made by the Volkswagen Group

See also
Sharana (disambiguation)
Sharran, Syria